Aghabullogue GAA are a Gaelic Athletic Association club in County Cork, Ireland.  They are affiliated to the Cork County Board and play in the mid-Cork (Muskerry) division of Cork GAA. Aghabullogue cater for both hurling and Gaelic football.

History
Aghabullogue have a long tradition of hurling. In 1890, they won the Cork Senior Hurling Championship. By the rules of the GAA at that time, this victory allowed Aghabullogue to go on and represent Cork in the All-Ireland Senior Hurling Championship.This was captained by Dan Lane.  They later collected a Munster title following a victory over Kerry. There was controversy in the subsequent All-Ireland final when an Aghabullogue men left the field after one of the players had his toe broken by a Wexford man's hurley. At a meeting the following week of the Gaelic Athletic Association's Central Council it was agreed to award Cork the All-Ireland title. In 1910, they won the Cork Intermediate Championship and in 1991 won the Cork County Junior Hurling Championship after a replay in which they defeated Aghada.

Roll of honour
 Cork Senior Hurling Championship (1): 1890 (Runners-Up 1911)
 Munster Senior Hurling Championship (1): 1890
 All-Ireland Senior Hurling Championship (1): 1890
 Cork Intermediate Hurling Championship (1): 1910 (Runners-Up 2020)
 Cork Intermediate A Football Championship (0): (Runners-Up 2013, 2018, 2022)
 Cork Junior Hurling Championship (1): 1991 (Runners-Up 1907, 1909, 1983)
 Cork Junior Football Championship (1): 2004
 Cork Premier Minor Hurling Championship (0): (Runners-Up 1998)
 Cork Minor A Hurling Championship (1): 1996
 Mid Cork Junior A Hurling Championship (16): 1937, 1949, 1952, 1954, 1955, 1973, 1974, 1976, 1981, 1983, 1984, 1986, 1988, 1989, 1991, 1998
 Mid Cork Junior A Football Championship (1): 2004

References

External links
Official Aghabullogue GAA website

Gaelic games clubs in County Cork
Gaelic football clubs in County Cork
Hurling clubs in County Cork